Artaulovo (Artawıl) is a rural locality (a village) in Aksaitovsky Selsoviet, Tatyshlinsky District, Bashkortostan, Russia. The population was 221 as of 2010. There are 2 streets.

Geography 
Artaulovo is located 27 km northwest of Verkhniye Tatyshly (the district's administrative centre) by road. Soyuz is the nearest rural locality.

References 

Rural localities in Tatyshlinsky District